Villalar de los Comuneros is a municipality located in the province of Valladolid, Castile and León, Spain. According to the 2004 census (INE), the municipality had a population of 449 inhabitants.

In its vicinity there was a crucial defeat of the rebels in the Castilian War of the Communities in 1521, the Battle of Villalar.

See also
Revolt of the Comuneros
Cuisine of the province of Valladolid

References

Municipalities in the Province of Valladolid